Bàrnabo delle montagne ("Bàrnabo of the mountains") is a 1933 novel by the Italian writer Dino Buzzati. It tells the story of a young forest ranger who belongs to a community which guards a storage with explosives, but is expelled after running away during a robber attack. The book was the basis for the 1994 film Barnabo of the Mountains, directed by Mario Brenta.

References

1933 novels
20th-century Italian novels
Italian novels adapted into films
Italian-language books
Novels by Dino Buzzati